The Broxbourne Council election, 1988 was held to elect council members of the Broxbourne Borough Council, the local government authority of the borough of Broxbourne, Hertfordshire, England.

Composition of expiring seats before election

Election results

Results summary 

An election was held in 14 wards on 5 May 1988.

15 seats were contested (2 seats in Hoddesdon North Ward)

The Conservative Party made 2 gains in Bury Green Ward and Hoddesdon Town Ward at the expense of the Labour Party and the Social & Liberal Democrats respectively.

The political balance of the council following this election was:

Conservative 36 seats
Labour 5 seats
Social and Liberal Democrats 1 Seat

Ward results

Notes

References

1988
1988 English local elections
1980s in Hertfordshire